Heinrich Nikolai Bauer (11 August 1874 Paide – 11 October 1927 Tallinn) was an Estonian politician. He was a member of II Riigikogu.

References

1874 births
1927 deaths
People from Paide
People from Kreis Jerwen
Christian People's Party (Estonia) politicians
Education ministers of Estonia
Members of the Riigikogu, 1923–1926
Estonian educators
University of Tartu alumni
Estonian military personnel of the Estonian War of Independence
Recipients of the Cross of Liberty (Estonia)